BWS may mean:
 Burnt Weeny Sandwich, a 1970 record by Frank Zappa & The Mothers of Invention
 BWS (liquor retailer), Australian liquor retailer, owned by Endeavour Group
 Barry Windsor-Smith, a British cartoonist, comics-author, and painter
 Beckwith-Wiedemann syndrome, a rare congenital disease
 The Black Wall Street Records, a record label started by rapper Game
 Bishop Wordsworth's School, a school in Salisbury, UK
 Bishop Walsh Primary School, a primary school, HK
 Brainwave synchronization
 Benzodiazepine withdrawal syndrome
 Battered woman syndrome
 Bombardier Wien Schienenfahrzeuge, (Bombardier Vienna rail vehicles)